Kuch Naa Kaho (Hindi: कुछ ना कहो, translation: Don't Say Anything) is a 2003 Indian Hindi-language romantic drama directed by Rohan Sippy, starring Aishwarya Rai, Abhishek Bachchan and Arbaaz Khan. It was released on 5 September 2003. This title of the film is based on a song from the film 1942: A Love Story (1994).

Plot

Raj (Abhishek Bachchan) is a happy and free-spirited Indian-American bachelor living with his mother (Suhasini Mulay) who visits his ancestral homeland in Mumbai, to attend his cousin Nikki's (Meghna Malik) wedding. Once in India, he finds himself pushed towards marriage by his overzealous uncle (Satish Shah). His uncle's employee, Namrata (Aishwarya Rai) chaperones Raj on a series of set-ups/dates, all of which he deliberately sabotages. During the course of the wedding ceremonies, Raj discovers that he is falling for Namrata. After some deliberation, he decides to tell her, but to his surprise, he discovers she has a 7-year-old son, Aditya.

Raj is confused but forms a strong fatherly relationship with Aditya. Raj's uncle informs him that Namrata's husband disappeared right before Aditya's birth, and has never returned to his son or wife. Finding a letter that Raj had written confessing his feelings, Namrata gets upset thinking Raj tried to use her son to get close to her. She attempts to distance herself from him, but a stubborn Raj follows her to Aditya's boarding school, having promised the boy to pose as his father. On being prodded by Raj, she tells him that her husband Sanjeev left her for another woman whilst she was pregnant. Namrata and Raj begin to bond.

After some months, Raj decides to introduce Namrata to his mother. A short while later, he finds out that Sanjeev (Arbaaz Khan) has returned and is looking to reconcile with Namrata. Namrata is aghast and makes it clear that she does not want anything to do with him. Sanjeev refuses to leave, becoming stubborn and persistent, threatening her with a lawsuit for custody of Aditya. This puts Namrata on the path of reconciliation with Sanjeev.

After a chance meeting, Raj invites Sanjeev to his home for the wedding. Aditya is present and is affectionate with Raj, calling him "Dad." Sanjeev becomes jealous and angry, insulting Raj and his family. After witnessing Sanjeev's bad behaviour towards Raj, Namrata finally gets the courage to stand up to him. She publicly tells him off and also admits. Sanjeev is ashamed and disappears once again warning Raj to not make the mistakes he made with his family.

Cast
 Aishwarya Rai as Namrata Sanjeev Kumar Srivastav 
 Abhishek Bachchan as Raj Malhotra
 Arbaaz Khan as Sanjeev Kumar Srivastav, Namrata's husband
 Satish Shah as Rakesh Sharma, Raj's uncle
 Master Parth Dave as Aditya Kumar Srivastav / Aditya Raj Malhotra aka Adi, Namrata and Sanjeev's son
 Jaspal Bhatti as Monty Ahluwalia
 Suhasini Mulay as Dr. Spocks Malhotra, Raj's mother
 Himani Shivpuri as Minty Ahluwalia
 Razzak Khan as Singal Pasli, Bird Walker
 Divya Palat as Rachna Singh Gangwar
 Tannaz Irani as Ms. Loccolith Lobo
 Ramona Sunavala as Babeethaa
 Meghna Malik as Nikki Sharma, Rakesh's daughter
 Jennifer Winget as Pooja Sharma, Nikki's sister
 Yusuf Hussain as Roshanlal Sehgal
 Zoya Afroz as Aria Sharma, Pooja's sister
 Eijaz Khan as Vikram (special appearance)
 Gautami Kapoor as Poonam "Pony" (special appearance)

Soundtrack

The music was composed by Shankar–Ehsaan–Loy. Lyrics were penned by Javed Akhtar. According to the Indian trade website Box Office India, with around 11,00,000 units sold, this film's soundtrack album was the year's thirteenth highest-selling.

Track listing

Box office
Kuch Naa Kaho collected  81,536,000, and despite a decent opening, it was declared a flop by Box Office India.

References

External links

India Times Site

2003 films
2003 romantic drama films
Films directed by Rohan Sippy
2000s Hindi-language films
Indian romantic drama films
Films scored by Shankar–Ehsaan–Loy
2003 directorial debut films